Orduna or Orduña may refer to:

 Orduña (officially Orduña-Urduña), a municipality in the province of Biscay, autonomous community of Basque Country, Spain
 Fructuoso Orduna (1893–1973), Spanish artist
 Joe Orduna (born 1948), American football running back
 Juan de Orduña (1900-1974), Spanish film director, screenwriter and actor
 Sergio Orduña (born 1954), Mexican football manager
 SS Orduña, an ocean liner (1913-1950)

See also